This is a list of the National Register of Historic Places listings in Runnels County, Texas.

This is intended to be a complete list of properties listed on the National Register of Historic Places in Runnels County, Texas. There are four properties listed on the National Register in the county. Two of these are Recorded Texas Historic Landmarks including one that is also a State Antiquities Landmark.

Current listings

The locations of National Register properties may be seen in a mapping service provided.

|}

See also

National Register of Historic Places listings in Texas
Recorded Texas Historic Landmarks in Runnels County

References

External links

Runnels County, Texas
Runnels County
Buildings and structures in Runnels County, Texas